The Costa Rica 2011 Census was undertaken by the National Institute of Statistics and Census (Instituto Nacional de Estadística y Censos (INEC)) in Costa Rica. The semi-autonomous government body, INEC, was created by Census Law No. 7839 on 4 November 1998.

The census
The census took place between Monday, 30 May 2011 and Friday, 3 June 2011 when 35,000 enumerators, mostly teachers, visited an estimated 1,300,000 households to count a population estimated before the census at about 4,650,000 individuals (the census itself counted 4,301,712 people).

The census questionnaire inquired about housing, including the physical and structural characteristics of the house, whether it was owned or rented, and if basic services (water, electricity) were present. The census form also asked about equipment in the house: telephone (mobile and fixed), vehicles, and information technology and communication (radio, television, cable or satellite, computer and internet).

Questions concerning the inhabitants asked about the number of people living in the household, number of households per housing unit, who was the head of the household, family relations between people living in the house, sex, age, and place of birth. Other questions inquired about disabilities and ethnic identification, among other things.

In Costa Rica, tourists and temporary visitors are not counted, but foreigners who have lived there for six months are included. Furthermore, participation is voluntary so residents can refuse to take part and enumerators will accept this response.

Primary school teachers have conducted the census since the 1950s. About 35,000 were needed in 2011 but not all teachers wanted to participate. The numbers were made up by students and statistics undergraduates from the University of Costa Rica, earning ₡50,000 ($100) for a week's work.

The census cost $3.6 million and preliminary results of the count were published in December 2011. It counted 4,301,712 people, an increase of 12.9 percent since the 2000 census.

Results by canton

References

External links
 View the census form — English version
 View the census form — Spanish version
 Download the Spanish version as PDF file — Scribd account required (free)
 National Institute of Statistics and Census of Costa Rica 
 Census supplement of La Nación newspaper  

Censuses in Costa Rica
2011 in Costa Rica
2011 censuses